Albert Village is a small post-industrial village in Leicestershire, England and is located approximately 1.5 miles (2.4 km) from the town of Swadlincote. The area's heritage is in coal-mining and pottery manufacture, both locally defunct. The National Forest's visitor attraction  'Conkers' is at nearby Moira. The population is included in the civil parish of Ashby Woulds.

Governance
Albert Village forms part of the civil parish of Ashby Woulds, which is part of the district of North West Leicestershire, and forms part of the border with Derbyshire.

Sport
Albert Village also has a children's football team - Albert Village Junior F.C. which caters for boys and girls from the ages of 3–7 years.

References

Villages in Leicestershire
North West Leicestershire District